Pembroke Dock is a town and a community in Pembrokeshire, South West Wales,  northwest of Pembroke on the banks of the River Cleddau. Originally Paterchurch, a small fishing village, Pembroke Dock town expanded rapidly following the construction of the Royal Navy Dockyard in 1814. The Cleddau Bridge links Pembroke Dock with Neyland.

After Haverfordwest and Milford Haven, Pembroke Dock is the third-largest town in Pembrokeshire being more populous than neighbouring Pembroke.

History 

The natural harbour (now the Milford Haven Waterway) offering shelter from the prevailing south-westerly winds, has probably been used for many thousands of years. From maps, the first evidence of settlement is the name of the Carr Rocks at the entrance, derived from the Norse-language Skare for rock.

From 790 until the Norman Invasion (1066) the estuary was used by the Vikings. During one visit, either in 854 or in 878, maybe on his way to the Battle of Cynuit, the Viking chieftain Hubba wintered in the haven with 23 ships.

In 1172, King Henry II's fleet and army were prepared in the mouth of the Pembroke River and sailed to Ireland during the Norman Invasion of Ireland.

Prior to 1814, the area was mostly farmland and known as Paterchurch. The first recorded mention of Paterchurch was in 1289. A medieval tower was built and like nearby 18th century and 19th century fortifications, it may have served as a lookout post. By the 17th century, additional domestic and farm buildings stood close to the tower and the isolated settlement had its own cemetery, whose last recorded burial is that of a Roger Adams, in 1731. The ruin of the tower now lies within the walls of the dockyard.

Paterchurch Tower was the centre of an estate said to stretch from Pennar Point to Cosheston. This changed hands in 1422 when Ellen de Paterchurch married a John Adams. Prior to the building of the town and before the dockyard was thought of, various sales and exchanges took place between the principal local landowners – the Adams, Owen and Meyrick families. These exchanges left the Meyricks in control of most of the land on which the dockyard and new town were to develop. By 1802 the Paterchurch buildings were mostly ruins.

During the Second World War Pembroke Dock was targeted by the German Luftwaffe. On Monday 19 August 1940 a Luftwaffe Junkers Ju 88 bomber flew up the haven waterway and bombed a series of oil tanks sited at Pennar. The oil-fuelled fire that followed raged for 18 days and was recorded as the largest UK conflagration since the Great Fire of London. Bombing on the night of 11 and 12 May 1941 resulted in 30 people killed and many injured in the town. Nearly 2,000 houses were damaged.

Naval dockyards

1758 Naval report
The origins of naval shipbuilding on Milford Haven were in the private shipyard of Jacobs on the north side of the waterway. In November 1757, the Admiralty sent a surveying delegation to the haven, which prepared a report for Parliament recommending, "the construction of a Milford dock yard". No such place as Milford existed at this time, just the village of Hubberston. Secondly, the report showed early signs of lobbying existing, with the scale of the local infrastructure and ship building activity exaggerated.

Milford Haven

Dockyard development began on the north bank of the waterway. By the late 18th century, much of the village and the lands around Hubberston were owned by diplomat and politician Sir William Hamilton. Together with his nephew, the Hon. Charles Grenville, he proposed a scheme of development under the title "Milford", in reference to the 1758 report. They began by building a shipyard, and leased it to a Messrs. Harry and Joseph Jacob, though after receiving an order in 1796 to build a frigate and later a 74-gun ship-of-the-line, Jacobs went bankrupt. The Navy took over the shipyard lease.

In 1809, a naval commission recommended purchase of the Milford Haven facility and formal establishment of a Royal Navy dockyard. After the end of the Napoleonic Wars, and the merging of the two sides of the Royal Navy under the Admiralty Board, a School of Naval Architecture was opened in Portsmouth in 1810 and, effectively then, Millford was to be set up as a model dockyard under French management (possibly to develop the manoeuvrability of British ships) from which lessons could be learnt for implementation in other dockyards.

New town of Pembroke Dock

This was one of the few sites in the haven suitable for building a dock for constructing decent sized ships, as its shoreline was flat but led quickly into deep harbour. Secondly, the Board of Ordnance had purchased  in preparation from the 1758 report to strengthen the haven's defences, which was added to by the purchase of an adjoining  for £5,500 from the Meyrick family.

The town of Pembroke Dock was founded in 1814 when Pembroke Dockyard was established, initially called Pater Dockyard. Construction started immediately, with the former frigate HMS Lapwing driven ashore as a temporary accommodation hulk. Orders were placed for the construction of 74 gun battleship, and four frigates. However, after the Battle of Waterloo in June 1815, although the scheme still seemed ill placed in what would be a smaller Royal Navy, the final plans were given the go ahead on 31 October 1815. The Naval Dockyards Society published a historical review in 2004.

Operations

On 10 February 1816, the first two ships were launched from the dockyard – HMS Valorous and Ariadne, both 20-gun post-ships, subsequently converted at Plymouth Dockyard into 26-gun ships. Over the span of 112 years, five royal yachts were built, along with 263 other Royal Navy vessels. The last ship launched from the dockyard was the Royal Fleet Auxiliary tanker Oleander on 26 April 1922.

In 1925, it was announced that the Royal Dockyards at Pembroke Dock and Rosyth were redundant and would be closed. A petition was sent to Prime Minister Stanley Baldwin, stressing the lack of alternative employment and the economic consequences of closure, but the decision was not overturned. First Sea Lord, Admiral of the Fleet Earl Beatty, said, "Whether these Yards are necessary for naval purposes, the Admiralty is the only competent judge. As to whether they are necessary for political or social reasons is for the Government to decide. The fact is, that so far as the upkeep of the Fleet is concerned, they are entirely redundant."

The last Pembroke-built ship afloat was the hulk of the iron screw frigate , which was broken up in Belgium in 1956. In June of the same year, Admiral Leonard Andrew Boyd Donaldson, the last Captain-Superintendent of Pembroke Dockyard, died aged 81.

Aftermath
Although active warships were not based in Pembroke Dock after the 1940s, and formal dockyard work ceased in 1926, the base remained an official Naval Dockyard, and retained a Queen's Harbour Master, until 2008 (one of the last 5 QHMs in the UK, together with those at the currently (2010) extant bases at Devonport, Portsmouth, Rosyth and Clyde). The Royal Maritime Auxiliary Service (RMAS) was based in Pembroke Dock until disestablishment in 2008, and the Ministry of Defence sold the freehold of the site to the Milford Haven Port Authority (MHPA) in 2007. For most of the last 20 years of MOD usage, the principal RMAS assets seen in the base were the MOD Salvage & Marine Team (formerly CSALMO) vessels located there, the majority of which were relocated to the Serco base in Burntisland on the River Forth upon the activation of the £1bn Future Provision of Marine Services (FPMS) contract in May 2008.

Future
In 2021 permission was granted for 'ambitious plans to transform Pembroke Dock's historic dockyard' as part of a '£60 million marine energy project'. The Welsh Government decided not to call in the proposal, despite protests from SAVE Britain's Heritage, the Georgian Group, the Victorian Society the Naval Dockyards Society and the Society for the Protection of Ancient Buildings, among others. The proposal will see buildings within the Conservation Area demolished, the Grade II* Graving Dock and the Grade II Timber Pond infilled and built over, the remaining Grade II listed Building Slips partially demolished and the setting of the adjacent Grade II Carr Jetty damaged. 

The chair of the local Commodore Trust (which has 'long fought to protect and revive the historic dockyard') has argued that 'these plans will see the destruction of a rare, if not unique, group of listed monuments that are a testament to the industry that gave birth to Pembroke Dock, revived the fortunes of Pembroke and gave the Milford Haven waterway a place in Wales, UK and world history'; Pembrokeshire County Council, however, was persuaded by the developers (Port of Milford Haven) that the economic benefits of the project would 'far outweigh' its impact on the historic environment. The project will see the listed structures replaced by two five-storey warehouses (to house future shipbuilding operations) and 'a giant concrete slipway, stretching out into the water alongside the grade II listed Hobbs point causeway'.

Military garrison 

As the dockyard and its importance grew, the need to defend it was addressed and Pembroke Dock became a military town. Work began in 1844 to build defensible barracks. In 1845 the first occupiers were the Royal Marines of the Portsmouth Division, followed through the years by many famous regiments. Between 1849 and 1857, two Martello towers of dressed Portland stone were constructed at the south-western and north-western corner of the dockyard; both were garrisoned by sergeants of artillery and their families.

In the 1850s a hutted encampment was established nearby on Llanion Hill. In 1904 this was replaced by four brick-built barrack blocks, designed to house a thousand troops. The new Llanion Barracks was 'the first barracks to be constructed with a separate area for cooking and ablutions and was one of the most modern in the country'.

The town remained garrisoned with troops until 1967.

RAF base 

With the closure of the dockyard in 1926, the year of the General Strike, unemployment was high through the Great Depression until 1931 when No. 210 Squadron RAF arrived equipped with Southampton II flying boats. For almost 30 years the Royal Air Force was based at Pembroke Dock. During 1943, when home to the Sunderland flying boats, it was the largest operational base for flying boats in the world.

It was announced in 1957 that the RAF would be drastically reducing its presence.

Pembroke Dock has a link to Hollywood: the full-scale Millennium Falcon built for The Empire Strikes Back was created in one of Pembroke Dock's hangars by Marcon Fabrications in 1979.

Today

Pembroke Dock is served by the A477 trunk road which runs from the A40 at St. Clears. At Waterloo the A477 road crosses the Daugleddau estuary on the Cleddau Bridge and continues towards Haverfordwest. It has a ferry terminal from which ferries sail twice-daily to Rosslare in Ireland. The service is operated by Irish Ferries. There is also a deep water cargo port (Pembroke Port) adjacent to the ferry terminal which is operated by the Port of Milford Haven. Pembroke Dock railway station connects with Carmarthen via Tenby.

The two Martello towers remain: one was a local museum but is for sale by auction in July 2019, while the other is in private hands and has been converted for residential use and is largely intact. The dockyard wall is substantially complete and has been recently repaired by experts with dressed stone and lime mortar. The dry dock also remains, along with two out of ten building slips. The two listed hangars built to house the Sunderland flying boats used to guard the Western Approaches have been rebuilt and are now used for other purposes. Among several surviving Georgian and Victorian buildings on the site is the Terrace, a row of houses for the Dockyard officers. The Dockyard Chapel at the end of the Terrace has been rebuilt using Objective One funding from the European Union and now serves as the Pembroke Dock Heritage Centre run by Pembroke Dock Sunderland Trust.

A few buildings on the site of the old Llanion Barracks still stand. The Officers' and Sergeants' Mess once used as council offices is now occupied by Pembrokeshire Coast National Park. The original guardroom remains and is now residential accommodation and a listed Victoria Powder Magazine remains set into the coastal slope which is accessible from Connacht Way. The old parade square has recently been converted for housing.

Two cemeteries in the town both hold many service graves. Pembroke Dock (Llanion) Cemetery contains the war graves of 23 Commonwealth service personnel, including two unidentified Royal Navy sailors, of the First World War and 51 of the Second, including four unidentified Royal Navy sailors and an unidentified airman. Pembroke Dock Military Cemetery contains the war graves of 40 Commonwealth service personnel of the First World War and 33 of the Second, and is believed to be the only dedicated military cemetery in Wales.

Han Solo's iconic craft The Millennium Falcon from Star Wars, was constructed at an aircraft hangar in Pembroke Dock in 1979.  The forty local builders were sworn to work in secrecy on the project known as "The Magic Roundabout".

The Pembrokeshire Technium was built and opened in 2006 and succeeded by Technium Science. Although the initial interest was slow the first major uptake on this facility began in 2009 when Infinergy built a wind farm in the local area and based its local office in the centre. There has been approval given by Pembrokeshire County Council for a new yacht marina to be built alongside Front Street but work has yet to begin.

Proposals to rename the town
There have been suggestions that Pembroke Dock should change its name, to improve the town's image in respect of a reputation for high unemployment and industrial decline. Proposals have included Pembroke Haven, Pembroke Harbour and a reversion to the original pre-1814 name of Paterchurch. A change of name was rejected in a referendum in the 1960s, and was again proposed in 2003.

Governance
There are two tiers of local government covering Pembroke Dock, at community (town) and county level: Pembroke Dock Town Council and Pembrokeshire County Council.

The town council comprises sixteen town councillors, and is based at 28 Dimond Street, a converted shop in the town centre.

In May 2022, Billy Gannon, one of the town councillors, was rumoured to be English street artist Banksy. He subsequently resigned because this was affecting his ability to carry out the duties of a councillor.

For representation on the county council, Pembroke Dock is divided into four electoral wards: (Pembroke Dock Central, Pembroke Dock Llanion, Pembroke Dock Market and Pembroke Dock Pennar), which each elect one county councillor.

Administrative history
Pembroke Dock formed part of the ancient parish of Pembroke St Mary, which was part of the borough of Pembroke. The borough was reformed to become a municipal borough in 1836, retaining the same boundaries and therefore continuing to include the growing town of Pembroke Dock. By 1895 Pembroke Borough Council had adopted the practice of holding its meetings alternately at Pembroke Town Hall and at Pembroke Dock, where the council had established its main administrative offices at 37 Bush Street (renumbered 71 Bush Street in 1906). The council remained based at 71 Bush Street (and later also expanded into neighbouring 73 Bush Street) until the early 1970s when it acquired Llanion Park, part of the Llanion Barracks at Pembroke Dock, to serve as its headquarters.

Pembroke Borough Council was abolished under the Local Government Act 1972, with the area becoming part of the new district of South Pembrokeshire within the county of Dyfed on 1 April 1974. A community was established to cover the area of the former borough, with its council taking the name Pembroke Town Council. South Pembrokeshire District Council took over Llanion Park at Pembroke Dock to serve as its headquarters.

On 1 April 1986 the community of Pembroke was split into a Pembroke Dock community and a reduced Pembroke community, just covering the older town. This was the first time Pembroke Dock had been administered separately from Pembroke. The Pembroke Dock community council chose to call itself Pembroke Dock Town Council.

South Pembrokeshire was abolished in 1996, with the area becoming part of a re-established Pembrokeshire.

Freedom of the Town
The following people and military units have received the Freedom of the Town of Pembroke Dock.

Individuals

Military Units
 HMS Pembroke, RN: 15 September 2006.

See also
History of Milford Haven

References

Further reading

External links
Pembroke Dock Heritage Centre
www.geograph.co.uk : photos of Pembroke Dock and surrounding area

 
Coast of Pembrokeshire
Communities in Pembrokeshire
Ports and harbours of Wales
Towns in Pembrokeshire